Julie Lee is a singer/songwriter originally from Maryland now living in Nashville, Tennessee. She is a member of the band Old Black Kettle, with Sarah Siskind, and has collaborated with Sarah Masen, Ron Block, Mike Farris, Vince Gill, Tim O'Brien, & Kenny Vaughan. Her songs have been covered by a wide range of artists, but most notably Alison Krauss with "Away Down the River" and "Jacob's Dream" (the story of the Lost Children of the Alleghenies) appearing on Krauss' album, A Hundred Miles or More: A Collection (2007). 
Lee has toured in the UK and US as an Americana/folk artist. She has opened for Alison Krauss & Union Station at The Historic Ryman Auditorium in 2001 and played her own set at The Newport Folk Festival in 2007.

Albums
 Stones (1999, Independent)
 Many Waters (2000)
 Made From Scratch (2003)
 Stillhouse Road (2004, Compadre)
 Take Me Out to Hear the Band (2007, Independent)
 OBK LIVE (2007) (Old Black Kettle Live at The Station Inn)
 Will There Really Be A Morning" (2009)
 Julie Lee & The Baby-Daddies (2012)
 Till And Mule (2013)

Contributions
 "The Choir At Your Door" (2006)- "Angel's We Have Heard On High"
 Song of America (2007) - "Once More Our God Vouchsafe to Shine"
 Angel Band: The Hymn Sessions (Andrew Greer) (2012) - "Down By the Riverside"
 "An East Nashville Christmas" (duet with Mike Farris)-"Go Tell It On The Mountain"

Lee's songs covered by other artists 
 "Beautiful Night" - Pam Tillis (Just in Time for Christmas)
 "Undone" - Mark Erelli
 "Here the Mountaintops to Roam" - Dave Peterson and 1946
 "Stillhouse Road - Mark Newton Band (Hillbilly Pilgrim)
 "Away Down the River" - Alison Krauss (A Hundred Miles or More: A Collection)
 "Jacob's Dream" - Alison Krauss (A Hundred Miles or More: A Collection)

External links 
 Official Website

American women singer-songwriters
American singer-songwriters
Living people
Year of birth missing (living people)
21st-century American women